Howard "Luke" A. Kenley (born March 28, 1945) is an American politician who served as a member of the Indiana Senate, city court judge, and mayor of Noblesville, Indiana.

Early life and education 
Kenley was born in Fort Stockton, Texas and attended both Miami University and Harvard Law School. He served in the United States Army from 1969 to 1971. He reached the rank First Lieutenant.

Career 
He represented the 20th District in the Indiana Senate. A Republican, Kenley was first elected to the Indiana State Senate in 1992, defeating incumbent Anthony C. Maidenberg. He took office on November 17, 1992. Before becoming a State Senator, Kenley served as a judge for Noblesville City Court from March 16, 1974, to September 1, 1989. He was appointed by Noblesville Mayor Max E. Robinson after incumbent judge, Jerry Barr, resigned. He was replaced by Stephen H. Free.

He made an unsuccessful bid to become the Republican nominee for Governor of Indiana in 2003, losing to Mitch Daniels. He retired from the Senate on September 30, 2017. He was replaced by Victoria Spartz.

References

External links
Virtual Office of Senator Luke Kenley official Indiana State Legislature site
 
 Luke Kenley at Ballotpedia

1945 births
Living people
Republican Party Indiana state senators
Harvard Law School alumni
People from Fort Stockton, Texas
21st-century American politicians
Miami University alumni